"Melodie" is a hip-hop ballad by German rapper Kool Savas. It features Senna Gammour, member of pop group Monrose, and R&B singer Moe Mitchell. The single released on April 18, 2008.

Music video 
The music video for "Melodie" is shot in black and white and guest stars Farid, contestant of German television show The Next Uri Geller.

Charts

References

External links 
 
 

2008 singles
Kool Savas songs
2008 songs